A spire is a tall, slender, pointed structure on top of a roof of a building or tower, especially at the summit of church steeples. A spire may have a square, circular, or polygonal plan, with a roughly conical or pyramidal shape. Spires are typically made of stonework or brickwork, or else of timber structures with metal cladding, ceramic tiling, roof shingles, or slates on the exterior.

Since towers supporting spires are usually square, square-plan spires emerge directly from the tower's walls, but octagonal spires are either built for a pyramidal transition section called a broach at the spire's base, or else freed spaces around the tower's summit for decorative elements like pinnacles. The former solution is known as a broach spire. Small or short spires are known as spikes, spirelets, or flèches.

Etymology
This sense of the word spire is attested in English since the 1590s, spir having been used in Middle Low German since the 14th century, a form related to the Old English word spir, meaning a sprout, shoot, or stalk of grass.

Gothic spires

The Gothic church spire originated in the 12th century as a simple, four-sided pyramidal structure on top of a church tower. The spire could be constructed of masonry, as at Salisbury Cathedral, or of wood covered with lead, as at Notre-Dame de Paris. Gradually, spires became taller, slimmer, and more complex in form. Triangular sections of masonry, called broaches were added to the sides, at an angle to the faces of the tower, as at St Columba, Cologne. In the 12th and 13th centuries, more ornament was added to the faces of the spires, particularly gabled dormers over the centres of the faces of the towers, as in the southwest tower of Chartres Cathedral. Additional vertical ornament, in the form of slender pinnacles in pyramid shapes, were often placed around the spires, to express the transition between the square base and the octagonal spire.

In England, a tall needle spire was sometimes constructed at the edge of tower, with pinnacles at the other corners. The western spires of Lichfield Cathedral are an example.

Spires were particularly fragile in the wind, and a number of English Gothic spires collapsed; notably that of Malmesbury Abbey (1180–1500); Lincoln Cathedral (which had been the tallest in the world) 1349–1549; and Chichester Cathedral (1402–1861). Finally, in 1668 the architect Christopher Wren designed reinforcing beams which halted the deformation of the structure.

Openwork spires were a notable architectural innovation, beginning with the spire at Freiburg Minster, in which the pierced stonework was held together by iron cramps. The openwork spire, represented a radical but logical extension of the Gothic tendency toward a skeletal structure.

Crown spires 

Crown spires have a fully exposed structure of arches not unlike the arches of a medieval European crown. The spire itself is supported by buttress structures.

Needle-spires and Hertfordshire spikes 

A needle-spire is a particularly tall and narrow spire emerging from a tower surrounded by a parapet. In general, the term applies to considerably larger and more refined spires than the name Hertfordshire spike.

A Hertfordshire spike is a type of short spire, needle-spire, or flèche ringed with a parapet and found on church-towers in the British Isles.

Splay-foot 
The roofs of splay-foot spires open out and flatten off at their base, creating eaves above the tower supporting the spire.

Flèches

A flèche is a name given to spires in Gothic architecture: in French the word is applied to any spire, but in English it has the technical meaning of a spirelet or spike on the rooftop of a building. In particular, the spirelets often built atop the crossings of major churches in mediaeval French Gothic architecture are called flèches.

On the ridge of the roof on top of the crossing (the intersection of the nave and the transepts) of a church, flèches were typically light, delicate, timber-framed constructions with a metallic sheath of lead or copper. They are often richly decorated with architectural and sculptural embellishments: tracery, crockets, and miniature buttresses serve to adorn the flèche.

The original flèche of Notre-Dame was built in the 13th century, and removed in 1786, shortly before the French Revolution. The famous replacement by Viollet-le-Duc with an abundance of sculpture was destroyed in the 2019 Notre-Dame de Paris fire. It will be rebuilt in the same form.

Pinnacles

A pinnacle is a miniature spire that was used both as a decorative and functional element. In early Gothic, as at Notre-Dame de Paris, stone pinnacles were placed atop flying buttresses, to give them additional weight and stability, and to counterbalance the outward thrust from the rib vaults of the nave. As an ornament, they were used to break up the horizontal lines, such as parapets and the roofs of towers. In later Gothic, they were sometimes often clustered together into forests of vertical ornament.

Traditional types of spires 

 Conical stone spires: These are usually found on circular towers and turrets, usually of small diameter.
 Masonry spires: These are found on medieval and revival churches and cathedrals, generally with towers that are square in plan. While masonry spires on a tower of small plan may be pyramidal, spires on towers of large plan are generally octagonal. The spire is supported on stone squinches which span the corners of the tower, making an octagonal plan. The spire of Salisbury Cathedral is of this type and is the tallest masonry spire in the world, remaining substantially intact since the 13th century. Other spires of this sort include the south spire of Chartres Cathedral, and the spires of Norwich Cathedral, Chichester Cathedral and Oxford Cathedral.
 Openwork spires: These spires are constructed of a network of stone tracery, which, being considerably lighter than a masonry spire, can be built to greater heights. Many famous tall spires are of this type, including the spires of Ulm Minster (the world's tallest church), Freiburg Minster, Strasbourg Cathedral, Vienna Cathedral, Prague Cathedral, Burgos Cathedral and the twin spires of Cologne Cathedral.
 Complex spires: These are stone spires that combine both masonry and openwork elements. Some such spires were constructed in the Gothic style, such as the north spire of Chartres Cathedral. They became increasingly common in Baroque architecture, and are a feature of Christopher Wren's churches.
 Clad spires: These are constructed with a wooden frame, often standing on a tower of brick or stone construction, but also occurring on wooden towers in countries where wooden buildings are prevalent. They are often clad in metal, such as copper or lead. They may also be tiled or shingled.
Clad spires can take a variety of shapes. These include:
Pyramidal spires, which may be of low profile, rising to a height not much greater than its width, or, more rarely, of high profile.
Rhenish helm: This is a four-sided tower topped with a pyramidal roof. each of the four sides of the roof is rhomboid in form, with the long diagonal running from the apex of roof to one of the corners of the supporting tower; each side of the tower is thus topped with a gable from whose peak a ridge runs to the apex of the roof.
Broach spires: These are octagonal spires sitting on a square tower, with a section of spire rising from each corner of the tower, and bridging the spaces between the corners and four of the sides.
Bell-shaped spires: These spires, sometimes square in plan, occur mostly in Northern, Alpine and Eastern Europe, where they occur alternately with onion-shaped domes.

Notable spires 

It was the first building to be taller than the Great Pyramid of Giza and nothing taller would be built until the Eiffel Tower was finished in 1889.
Beauvais's tower collapsed in 1573, after which St Mary's remained the tallest building until 1647, when the spire was destroyed by lightning and subsequently replaced with a lower Baroque dome (excepting 1569–1573)
The architecture of the spires blends entirely with the tower, making them difficult to separate. The church is the tallest cathedral anywhere and has the tallest pair of spires.
 St Martin's Church, Landshut, spire whose Brick Gothic tower was finished in 1507, makes it the tallest brick-built church in the world, and the second tallest (unreinforced) brick building anywhere.
 The spire at Burghley House in England, built for Elizabeth I's Lord Chancellor in 1585 is an example of a spire on a non-religious building.
 The 123 metre spire of Antwerp Cathedral is the tallest ecclesiastical structure in the Low Countries.
 The 119 metre pair of spires of Uppsala Cathedral are the tallest in Scandinavia.
 Ulm Minster, a Lutheran church in Germany, has the distinction of having the tallest church tower in Europe, at 161.5 metres or 530 feet. The height was deliberately sought to make it slightly higher than the Catholic Cologne Cathedral.
 The Spire of Notre-Dame de Paris designed by Eugène Viollet-le-Duc was a famous flèche that crowned the crossing ridge of Notre-Dame de Paris between 1859 and 2019.
 The organic skeleton of Antoni Gaudi's spires at the Sagrada Família in Barcelona are a blend of Gothic and Gaudi's particular style. Designed and begun by Gaudi in 1884, they are still being completed in the early 21st century.

Religious symbolism
In Gothic architecture, where the spire is most commonly used, and particularly in Gothic cathedrals and churches it symbolised the heavenly aspirations of churches' builders, as well as offering a visual spectacle of extreme height. It also suggested, by its similarity to a spear point, the power and strength of religion.

List of tallest spires (skyscraper)

See also

Pinnacle
Flèche
Crooked spire 
List of twisted spires
Gothic architecture
Gothic cathedrals and churches
Spire of Dublin

References

Towers
Architectural elements
Church architecture